The Bhutan Kuen-Nyam Party (BKP;) was a social democratic political party in Bhutan. Its President from May 2017 to July 2020 was Dasho Neten Zangmo, who took over from Sonam Tobgay, the President from 2013 to 2017. Neten Zangmo was provisionally replaced by vice-president Sonam Tobgay until a new party convention was held.

The BKP was favourable to same-sex marriage. It included the rights of LGBT+ people in its program for the general election of 2018.

The BKP submitted a request to the Election Commission of Bhutan in January 2023 asking to dissolve the party, following the failure for several years to name a new party president and difficulties in finding candidates for the 2023 election.

References

Political parties in Bhutan
Social democratic parties in Asia
Political parties established in 2013
Political parties disestablished in 2023